The 7440th Composite Wing (Provisional) was a Major Air Command-controlled (MAJCON) temporary wing of the United States Air Forces in Europe (USAFE), active in Turkey in 1991. The concentration of aircraft under the 7440th Wing's control made possible the opening of a "northern front" against Iraq, via Turkey, during the 1991 Gulf War.

Formation
By late December 1990, there was already a formidable arsenal of USAFE airpower deployed to Turkey: 20 F-111Es, 24 F-16Cs, 10 F-15Cs, and 4 SAC KC-135s.  These aircraft were in Turkey for various reasons including rotational training, a NATO exercise, and NATO alert duty, but remained under control of their respective home units. Eventually more than 100 USAFE aircraft and 2,600 personnel deployed to Incirlik. However, if Turkey approved the task force's activation, Joint Task Force Proven Force could absorb all of these assets and the others it required.

Operations
The Turkish government finally approved the JTF on 15 January 1991. The following day, USAFE activated the Wing and began the command's largest Desert Shield deployment, bringing the total number of aircraft at Incirlik to 110. However, it was not until 17 January, the first day of Desert Storm, that Turkey approved operations from Incirlik. Therefore, JTF Proven Force entered the war on Day Two.

The 3rd Tactical Fighter Wing deployed six F-4Es to join the 7440th Wing in early 1991, flying an 18,600-mile deployment. They were mission ready within 36 hours and they flew some of that aircraft's last combat sorties. The 20th Tactical Fighter Wing had aircraft deployed to Incirlik for a Weapons Training Deployment in August 1990, when Iraq invaded Kuwait. As the start of the air campaign neared, the 20th TFW reinforced its presence, as all US aircraft at Incirlik were incorporated into the 7440th Composite Wing (Provisional).

Following Desert Storm, the 7440th Wing conducted all initial planning, logistics, and air operations for Operation Provide Comfort, airlift missions to supply over 1 million Kurdish refugees in the mountains of Northern Iraq. In the 31 days of airlift operations without benefit of friendly ground forces at the drop zones, the 6-nation airlift dropped more tonnage and flew more miles than the entire Berlin Airlift. As Provide Comfort continued after the introduction of 10th Special Forces into the refugee camps, the 7440th transitioned into Joint Task Force Provide Comfort. The initial airlift was under the command of Colonel Chuck Wald with Lt. Colonel Mike DeCapua as planning and intelligence section chief.

Composition

See also
 Organization of United States Air Force Units in the Gulf War

References

Four Digit Wings of the United States Air Force
Military units and formations established in 1991
1991 establishments in the United States